Tierra Blanca Creek is an ephemeral stream about  long, heading in Curry County, New Mexico, flowing east-northeast across northern portions of the Llano Estacado to join Palo Duro Creek to form the Prairie Dog Town Fork Red River southeast of Amarillo, Texas. Overall, Tierra Blanca Creek descends  from its headwaters in Eastern New Mexico to its confluence with Palo Duro Creek at the head of Palo Duro Canyon.

The creek's water levels are variable, and it is not unusual for some parts of the creek to be reduced to a small trickle or dry completely during frequent periods of drought in the semi-arid plateau of the northwestern Texas Panhandle.  At the same time, as the sole creek bed draining a large region with frequent violent thunderstorms, it is also the site of significant occasional Flash floods.  Its diminishing flow has been attributed to damming and agricultural pumping of the Ogallala Aquifer.

Tierra Blanca Creek was historically significant as the major running water source for the XIT Ranch, one of the largest cattle ranches in American history.  It also contributed to the formation of Palo Duro Canyon, the second largest canyon in the United States.

The Name

Tierra Blanca is Spanish for "white earth".  One theory suggests that the name refers to white deposits of Tertiary clay that are found along the sides of the valley.  Another theory suggests that it was the exposed traces of white caliche along the valley walls that gave this stream its Spanish name.

See also
List of rivers of Texas
Buffalo Lake National Wildlife Refuge
North Fork Red River
Pease River
Washita River
Wichita River

References

External links

Palo Duro Canyon State Park official website

Rivers of Texas
Tributaries of the Red River of the South
Bodies of water of Potter County, Texas